Zonovan "Bam" Knight (born April 11, 2001) is an American football running back for the New York Jets of the National Football League (NFL). He played college football at NC State.

High school career
Knight attended Southern Nash High School in Bailey, North Carolina. During his high school career, he had a school record 5,073 rushing yards rushing and 71 touchdowns. He committed to North Carolina State University to play college football.

College career
As a true freshman at NC State in 2019, Knight started seven games and led the team with 745 yards on 136 carries with five touchdowns. In 2020, he again led the team with 788 yards on 143 carries with 10 touchdowns. He returned to NC State as the starter in 2021.

Professional career

Knight signed with the New York Jets as an undrafted free agent on May 6, 2022.  He made the Jets' initial 53 man roster on August 30, 2022.  He was waived on September 5. He was re-signed to the practice squad the next day. He was promoted to the active roster on October 25. Knight made his NFL debut on November 27 against the Chicago Bears, where he set a new franchise record with 103 yards from scrimmage in his debut, including 69 rushing yards.

NFL career statistics

References

External links
New York Jets bio
NC State Wolfpack bio

2001 births
Living people
People from Nash County, North Carolina
Players of American football from North Carolina
American football running backs
NC State Wolfpack football players
New York Jets players